This is a list of Annona species, trees in the Annonaceae family, there are 169 accepted as of April 2021:

Annona acuminata 
Annona acutiflora 
Annona acutifolia 
Annona amazonica 
Annona ambotay 
Annona andicola 
Annona angustifolia 
Annona annonoides 
Annona asplundiana 
Annona atabapensis 
Annona × atemoya  – atemoya
Annona aurantiaca 
Annona bahiensis 
Annona bicolor 
Annona billbergii 
Annona boliviana 
Annona bullata 
Annona burchellii 
Annona cacans 
Annona caesia 
Annona calcarata 
Annona calophylla 
Annona campestris 
Annona caput-medusae 
Annona cascarilloides 
Annona centrantha 
Annona cercocarpa 
Annona cherimola  – cherimoya
Annona cherimolioides 
Annona contrerasii 
Annona cordifolia 
Annona coriacea 
Annona cornifolia 
Annona crassiflora 
Annona crassivenia 
Annona cristalensis 
Annona crotonifolia 
Annona cubensis 
Annona cuspidata 
Annona danforthii 
Annona deceptrix 
Annona deminuta 
Annona densicoma 
Annona dioica 
Annona dolabripetala 
Annona dolichopetala 
Annona dolichophylla 
Annona domingensis 
Annona duckei 
Annona dumetorum 
Annona echinata 
Annona ecuadorensis 
Annona edulis 
Annona ekmanii 
Annona emarginata 
Annona excellens 
Annona exsucca 
Annona fendleri 
Annona ferruginea 
Annona foetida 
Annona fosteri 
Annona frutescens 
Annona gardneri 
Annona gigantophylla 
Annona glabra 
Annona glauca 
Annona glaucophylla 
Annona globiflora 
Annona glomerulifera 
Annona gracilis 
Annona haematantha 
Annona haitiensis 
Annona havanensis 
Annona hayesii 
Annona helosioides 
Annona herzogii 
Annona hispida 
Annona holosericea 
Annona humilis 
Annona hypoglauca 
Annona hystricoides 
Annona impressivenia 
Annona inconformis 
Annona insignis 
Annona ionophylla 
Annona iquitensis 
Annona jahnii 
Annona jamaicensis 
Annona jucunda 
Annona leptopetala 
Annona liebmanniana 
Annona longiflora 
Annona longipes 
Annona macrocalyx 
Annona macroprophyllata 
Annona malmeana 
Annona mammifera 
Annona manabiensis 
Annona maritima 
Annona membranacea 
Annona micrantha 
Annona moaensis 
Annona montana  – mountain soursop
Annona monticola 
Annona mucosa 
Annona muricata  – soursop
Annona nana 
Annona neglecta 
Annona neoamazonica 
Annona neochrysocarpa 
Annona neoecuadoarensis 
Annona neoelliptica 
Annona neoinsignis 
Annona neosalicifolia 
Annona neosericea 
Annona neoulei 
Annona neovelutina 
Annona nipensis 
Annona nitida 
Annona nutans 
Annona oblongifolia 
Annona oleifolia 
Annona oligocarpa 
Annona oxapampae 
Annona pachyantha 
Annona palmeri 
Annona paludosa 
Annona papilionella 
Annona paraensis 
Annona paraguayensis 
Annona parviflora 
Annona pickelii 
Annona pittieri 
Annona poeppigii 
Annona praetermissa 
Annona prevostiae 
Annona pruinosa 
Annona punicifolia 
Annona purpurea  – Soncoya
Annona rensoniana 
Annona reticulata  – custard apple
Annona rigida 
Annona rosei 
Annona rufinervis 
Annona rugulosa 
Annona saffordiana 
Annona salicifolia 
Annona salzmannii  – beach sugar apple
Annona sanctae-crucis 
Annona scandens 
Annona schunkei 
Annona scleroderma 
Annona sclerophylla 
Annona senegalensis 
Annona sericea 
Annona spinescens 
Annona spraguei  – Panama cherimoya
Annona squamosa  – sugar apple
Annona stenophylla 
Annona sylvatica 
Annona symphyocarpa 
Annona tenuiflora 
Annona tenuipes 
Annona tomentosa 
Annona ulei 
Annona urbaniana 
Annona vepretorum 
Annona volubilis 
Annona warmingiana 
Annona williamsii 
Annona xylopiifolia

References

External links

List
Annona